Sri Lanka is a tropical island situated close to the southern tip of India. It is situated in the middle of Indian Ocean. Because of being an island, Sri Lanka has rich endemic terrestrial and freshwater fauna, including vertebrates and several invertebrates.

Amphibian
Phylum: Chordata
Class: Amphibia

Amphibians are ectothermic vertebrates of the class Amphibia. They have soft glandular skin and live in all habitats of the world except for the ice caps. They complete an amphibious lifestyle where larval stages live in water and adults live on or closer to land. With their complex reproductive needs and permeable skins, amphibians are often ecological indicators.

Sri Lanka is host to over 120 species of amphibians, of which over 90 species are endemic to the country. The 85% of endemicity ratio makes Sri Lanka the country which has the highest amphibian endemism in Asia. During the past decade many more new amphibians have been found in Sri Lanka.

The first amphibian review in Sri Lanka in 1957 identified 35 species. In 1996 the number of amphibian species rose to 53 based on research of museum collections and also a field survey. More than 250 species were proposed based on this field survey by Rohan Pethiyagoda and Kelum Manamendra-Arachchi in 1998. However Madhava Meegaskumbura et al. revised the number to around 140 species, and the discovery of over "new" 100 species has been criticised. As at 2019, 122 descriptions of amphibian species have been published, with 113 endemics. Three caecilian species has been identified with one undescribed species.

Sri Lanka harbours three endemic genera, Adenomus, Nannophrys, and Lankanectes. Most of the new species are of the genus Philautus which was assigned to genus Pseudophilautus recently. Hence, there are no amphibians of the genus Philautus (sensu stricto) in Sri Lanka. Pseudophilautus pardus and P. maia, the species known only from collections made prior to 1876 are described as new species in 2007, but both are extinct. In April 2015, Mendis Wickrremasinghe et al. described another endemic Pseudophilautus species P. dilmah. In January 2019, the new species, P. conniffae was discovered in southern Sri Lanka.

Sri Lanka has the highest percentage of extinct and threatened amphibian species in Asia. In the 20th century the country has lost 20% of its amphibians and more than half of the remaining species are on the verge of extinction. Of the world's 34 amphibian fauna that have gone extinct in the last 500 years, 19 are from Sri Lanka. Habitat loss is attributed as the main cause of threats while fragmentation, use of pesticides, and air pollution are among others.

Amphibian diversity of Sri Lanka

Order Anura: frogs

Order Gymnophiona: caecilians

References

Sri Lanka
amphibians
Sri Lanka